Tytherington School is an academy in Macclesfield, Cheshire, England. The school has experienced a surge in popularity in the last few years and as of September will have approximately 1,300 pupils, with ages ranging from 11–18. Like many schools in Cheshire, it includes a sixth form. Since September 2015, the headteacher has been 	Emmanuel Botwe, who was previously deputy headteacher at a school in Oxfordshire. In the summer of 2016, under the new head, the school had record A-Level and GCSE results.

History 
The school traces its history back to an independent girls' school founded in the 1860s, but it was founded on its current site in the early 1950s, and became a mixed-sex school in the 1970s.

The school is split into year groups, (year 7 through to year 13), and houses. The houses are named Oak, Ash and Elm, in recognition of the traditional royal hunting woodlands in the Macclesfield area. The school also has a sixth form, Tytherington Sixth Form College.

Completely rebuilt in 1957, the school has been extended over the years including a £1 million Sports Hall sponsored by the National Lottery and multi-discipline technology block. The Learning Resource Centre (comprising library and ICT suite) and sixth form block have also benefited from renovations. These improvements were part of a £3.1 million capital building programme that included a new 10 classroom block, called the Jubilee Block, that was completed in summer 2012, the project was paid for by Cheshire East Council. Before this, a new art was block built in 2006. Other renovations were also carried to existing blocks in the 2011–2012 academic year. Classroom renovations in the Learning Resource Centre were completed in April 2012, building a cafe for sixth form students, the new block opened at the start of the 2012–13 academic year.

During the 2014–15 academic year the school changed its name from Tytherington High School to Tytherington School to indicate the school's new status as an academy.

Culture and values 
The school has a house system and is known for its extensive extra-curricula provision. On Thursdays the school offers a range of "electives" for students in the lower school. The school has a strong reputation for public speaking and in May 2019 the school won the National Rotary Club Public Speaking Championships. The school has also made it through to the 2020 Finals which were postponed as a result of the COVID-19 outbreak.

The uniform consists of a maroon blazer with the school crest, white shirts, a school tie, black trousers/skirt and black leather shoes. Jumpers may be worn under the blazer, along with tights for girls. The school crest depicts a golden stag with a crown, a reference to the historic royal hunting grounds in Macclesfield.

References 

Secondary schools in the Borough of Cheshire East
School buildings in the United Kingdom destroyed by arson
Academies in the Borough of Cheshire East